NGC 2441 is a barred spiral galaxy located in the northern constellation of Camelopardalis. A Type 1a supernova, SN1995E, occurred in NGC 2441, and observations suggest it may display a light echo, where light from the supernova is reflected from matter along our line of sight, making it appear to "echo" outwards from the source. The diameter of the galaxy is about 130,000 light-years.

References

External links
 

Camelopardalis (constellation)
Barred spiral galaxies
2441
04036
022031
+12-08-015